Hardi Volmer (born 8 November 1957 in Pärnu) is an Estonian film director, puppet theatre set decorator and musician.  Volmer is the singer in the Estonian punk rock band Singer Vinger.

Animated cartoons 
"Imeline nääriöö" (Wonderful New Year's Eve, 1984)
"Nõiutud saar" (Bewitched Island, 1985)
"Kevadine kärbes" (Fly in Spring, 1986)
"Sõda" (War, 1987)
"Tööd ja tegemised" (Works and Doings, 1988)
"Animeeritud autoportreed" (Animated Self-portraits, 1989)
"Jackpot" (1990)
"Incipit vita nova" (1992)
"Hilinenud romanss" (Late Romance, 1994)
"Keegi veel" (Someone More, 1998)
"Primavera" (1999)

Movies 
Igaühele oma ("Something to Everyone", 1992)
Tulivesi ("Firewater", 1994)
Minu Leninid ("All My Lenins", 1997)
Elavad pildid ("Living Images", 2013)
Johannes Pääsukese tõeline elu ("Johannes Pääsuke's Real Life", 2019)

References

External links

1957 births
Estonian film directors
Living people
20th-century Estonian male singers
Estonian animators
Estonian animated film directors
Estonian rock singers
People from Pärnu
21st-century Estonian male singers
Recipients of the Order of the White Star, 5th Class
Members of the Riigikogu, 2015–2019